Sue Newman is a New Hampshire politician.

Early life
Newman was born in Rochester, New York. In 1981, Newman moved to Nashua, New Hampshire after at different times living in Germany, Florida, Georgia and Virginia.

Education
Newman went to college for two years.

Political career
On November 8, 2016, Newman was elected to the New Hampshire House of Representatives where she represents the Hillsborough 29 district. She assumed office later in 2016. She is a Democrat.

Personal life
Sue Newman resides in Nashua, New Hampshire. Sue is married to fellow state representative Ray Newman. Together they have three children and six grandchildren.

References

Living people
Politicians from Rochester, New York
Politicians from Nashua, New Hampshire
Women state legislators in New Hampshire
Democratic Party members of the New Hampshire House of Representatives
Spouses of New Hampshire politicians
21st-century American politicians
21st-century American women politicians
Year of birth missing (living people)